Răzvan is a Romanian-language male given name. It may refer to:

People

Arts and sciences

Military

Politics

Sports

Association football 

 Răzvan Andronic — (–) midfielder
 Răzvan Avram — (–) footballer
 Răzvan Burleanu — (–) president of the Romanian Football Federation
 Răzvan Cociș — (–) former footballer
 Răzvan Dâlbea — (–) former footballer
 Răzvan Damian — (–) defender
 Răzvan Ştefănel Farmache — (–) footballer

Rugby union 

 Răzvan Ailenei — (–) footballer

Swimming 

 Răzvan Florea — (–) backstroke swimmer

Fictional characters

Films 

 King Răzvan, the villain of Dragonheart: Vengeance

See also 

 Ștefan Răzvan

References 

Romanian masculine given names

 Răzvan Fodor
 Răzvan Grădinaru
 Răzvan Greu
 Răzvan Horj
 Răzvan Ilișescu
 Răzvan Ion
 Răzvan Lucescu
 Răzvan Marc
 Răzvan Marin
 Răzvan Martin
 Răzvan Mavrodin
 Răzvan Neagu
 Răzvan Ochiroșii
 Răzvan Pădurețu
 Răzvan Penescu
 Răzvan Petcu
 Răzvan Pleșca
 Răzvan Popa
 Răzvan Radu
 Răzvan Raț
 Răzvan Rădulescu
 Răzvan Riviș
 Răzvan Rusu
 Răzvan Sabău
 Răzvan Stanca
 Răzvan Dorin Șelariu
 Răzvan Theodorescu
 Răzvan Tincu
 Răzvan Trandu
 Răzvan Țârlea
 Mihai Răzvan Ungureanu
 Răzvan Vasilescu